James A. Aiken Jr. (born 1967) is a United States Navy rear admiral and surface warfare officer who serves as the 11th commander of the United States Naval Forces Southern Command and United States Fourth Fleet since September 3, 2021. He was promoted to his present rank on April 1, 2021.

A native of Pittsburgh, Aiken earned his commission via the NROTC Program at Pennsylvania State University with a bachelor's degree in political science. He also earned a master’s degree in strategic studies from the United States Naval War College.

Awards and decorations

References

1967 births
Living people
People from Pittsburgh
Military personnel from Pennsylvania
Pennsylvania State University alumni
Naval War College alumni
Recipients of the Defense Superior Service Medal
Recipients of the Legion of Merit
Recipients of the Meritorious Service Medal (United States)
United States Navy rear admirals (upper half)